The 2005 season is the 54th year in Guangzhou Football Club's existence, their 40th season in the Chinese football league and the 14th season in the professional football league.

Competitions

Chinese FA Cup

Matches

Chinese football clubs 2005 season
Guangzhou F.C. seasons